The following list is a list of massacres that have occurred in Burundi (numbers may be approximate):

References 

Burundi
Massacres

Massacres